Nikhil Shankar Naik (born 9 November 1994) is an Indian cricketer who plays for Maharashtra cricket team. He is a right-handed batsman and occasional wicket-keeper. He made his List A debut on 27 February 2014, for Maharashtra in the 2013–14 Vijay Hazare Trophy. In 2015, he was signed up by the Indian Premier League franchise Kings XI Punjab for Rs. 30 lakh.

In December 2018, he was bought by the Kolkata Knight Riders in the player auction for the 2019 Indian Premier League. He made his first-class debut for Maharashtra in the 2018–19 Ranji Trophy on 7 January 2019. During a match in the 2019 season of the  Syed Mushtaq Ali Trophy, he smashed five sixes in an over against Railways at the Holkar Stadium.  He was released by the Kolkata Knight Riders ahead of the 2020 IPL auction. In the 2020 IPL auction, he was bought by the Kolkata Knight Riders ahead of the 2020 Indian Premier League.

References

External links 
 

1994 births
Living people
Indian cricketers
Maharashtra cricketers
Punjab Kings cricketers
Kolkata Knight Riders cricketers
People from Sindhudurg district
Cricketers from Maharashtra
Wicket-keepers